The Ipoh railway station is a Malaysian train station located at the south-western side of and named after the capital city of Ipoh, Perak. It serves as the main railway terminal for the state under Keretapi Tanah Melayu offering KTM ETS services, as well as handling freight trains. Although there are nine tracks, only four are electrified and three of the electrified tracks are used for the ETS service. The remaining six other tracks are used for freight trains.

Designed by Arthur Benison Hubback, the current station was officially opened in 1917. Affectionately known as the Taj Mahal of Ipoh by its locals, the building also houses a station hotel called the Majestic Hotel.

Location and locality 
The station is located at Jalan Panglima Bukit Gantang Wahab where the road also locates the Ipoh Main Post Office, Ipoh Court Complex and also Ipoh Town Hall. Other places like Birch Memorial Clock Tower, Padang Ipoh, Tun Razak Library and State Mosque is also located nearby. 

This station serves generally towards the Ipoh city area with passengers comes from many parts of the city, with exception of southwestern parts like Lahat and Pengkalan which is closer to Batu Gajah station instead. Accessibility and service factor also influence passenger from some other towns nearby to alight at this station, even goes as far as Sungai Siput. 

While originally there's a few station that serves different parts of the city like Tasek and Tanjong Rambutan, many of them either made limited or closed after the electrification projects of the tracks, causing Ipoh becoming not only the central station, but also the only station that serve most part of the cities.

Early history 
The first Ipoh station was constructed in 1894 as railway tracks for the Perak Railway (PR) were first laid along Ipoh, serving the town for 20 years through the final years of the PR and its consolidation into the Federated Malay States Railways (FMSR).

In 1914, construction of a second station and hotel to replace the first station began; dogged by material shortages and escalating costs of labour during the Great War, the station was only completed in 1917. The new double-storey station building was constructed with vastly larger space to not only house railway offices, but also Majestic Hotel, an enclose hotel that also boasted a restaurant and a bar. Originally offering 17 bedrooms which directly grant access to the second floor loggia, the hotel upgraded its number of rooms to 21 in 1936.

For over 80 years, through the operational years of the FMSR and its eventual successor, Malayan Railways, the station's overall layout has remained largely unchanged since its construction due to minimal upgrading exercises throughout the wider Peninsular Malaysian railway network.

Architecture 

Like many early stations built under Perak Railway, the 1894 station's construction was rudimentary, consisting of a single-storey wooden structure with massive pitched tiled roofs and an overall open air layout.

The 1917 station's design was conceptualised by Arthur Benison Hubback, a British architectural assistant to the Director of Public Works credited for designing various public buildings in British Malaya in various vernacular colonial Western styles as well as "Neo-Moorish/Mughal/Indo-Saracenic/Neo-Saracenic" styles that draw influences from British Indian colonial architecture. In contrast to the Kuala Lumpur railway station, the Ipoh station's exterior is more distinctively Western in design, drawing elements of late-Edwardian Baroque architecture and incorporating moderate rustication on the base of the ground floor, opened pointed and arched pediments, extensive use of engaged columns, and a large central dome over the porte-cochère, while integrating vernacular elements such as deep, open air loggias into the ground floor and upper floor of the building (the ground floor's loggia measures at 183 metres, the length of the station's frontage). In spite of its overall aesthetics, elements of Indo-Saracenic architecture are still found in the form of miniature chhatris towering over corner support columns on both sides of the structure.

The 1917 station originally featured three platforms; one side platform and two platforms on an island connected by tunnels, with steel-and-wood pitched canopies as shelter.

Electrification and reconstruction 
As part of KTM's double tracking and electrification project between Ipoh and Rawang, the Ipoh station was significantly renovated over the course of the 2000s. The most dramatic change is the total rebuilding of the platform area, which composed of new platforms levelled to the height of train carriage entrances, as well as accommodation for newly laid double track and overhead lines; the upgrade also replaced the original tunnels between platforms and canopies with an overhead bridge and a curving steel-framed train shed; only the platforms' original wooden benches were retained. Although some interior refurbishment on portions of the ground floor of the main building were also conducted, remaining elements of the station building, including the station's Majestic Hotel, were preserved. The overhaul was completed in October 2007, three months before the conclusion of railway electrification between Ipoh and Rawang.

Ipoh Station Square and Ipoh cenotaph 
The Ipoh station is fronted by a large square known as the Ipoh Station Square. For much of its early history the square is a lawn sparsely lined with trees; a garden park was eventually built over the site over the course of the 1970s and 1980s, incorporating heavier vegetation, tiled and paved pathways, and a plaza containing sculptures and fountains. Between 2011 and 2013 the entire square was heavily stripped and rebuilt as an open plaza featuring minimalist terraces, and wider open lawn patches. The reconstructed square is rebranded as the "Ipoh Heritage Square", serving as the starting point of the Ipoh heritage trail.

The square is also prominent for a cenotaph erected in the centre. Unveiled during the 1927 Armistice Day, the stone brick cenotaph was built to honour men from Perak who have died in the Great War. The cenotaph has subsequently been modified with new plaques to honour fallen soldiers from Perak in World War II, the Malayan Emergency, the Indonesian confrontation and the "Re-insurgency Period". As a result of the cenotaph's location the square has been a long-time local venue for Remembrance Day and Anzac Day. Some earlier plaques have been removed and replaced in an intervening change; the original brass plaque for the Great War dead has been restored although it is reinstalled on a different side of the cenotaph while several decorative brass parts have remained missing; to counter further vandalism the brass plaque has been covered with protective plastic shielding. A more recent addition is a memorial plaque that pays tribute to combatant and non-combatant prisoners of war who died building the Thailand–Burma Railway. The cenotaph are among the few elements of the Ipoh Station Square that were preserved during the 2011—2013 rebuild.

Also preserved in the rebuild was a matured Ipoh tree planted on 18 January 1980 under the observance of Perak Menteri Besar Wan Mohamed Wan Teh, in conjunction with the 50th anniversary of the Rotary Club of Ipoh. Following the snapping of the 1980 tree during a windstorm on 28 April 2017, a new Ipoh sapling was replanted on 21 February 2018 with Menteri Besar Zambry Abdul Kadir in attendance.

In popular culture 
 The 1917 station's exterior and original platform level are illustrated as the backdrops for the final act of Town Boy (1981).
 The Ipoh station was used as a shooting location for the film Anna and the King (1999).

See also

 Rail transport in Malaysia

References

External links 
 Ipoh Railway Station

KTM ETS railway stations
Railway stations opened in 1935
Buildings and structures in Ipoh
Railway stations in Perak